Ilchenko is a Ukrainian surname. Notable people with the surname include:

 Dmytro Ilchenko (born 1996), Ukrainian handball player
 Irina Ilchenko (born 1968), Russian volleyball player
 Larisa Ilchenko (born 1988), Russian long-distance swimmer

See also
 

Ukrainian-language surnames